The Fortification Range is a mountain range in Lincoln and White Pine counties, Nevada. It is typical of the Basin and Range Province.

The Wilson Creek Range and the old townsite–mining camp of Atlanta lies to the southeast of the south end of the range. Spring Valley and the Snake Range lie to the east and the Limestone Hills to the southeast. To the west is Lake Valley and the Schell Creek Range. US Route 93 traverses Lake Valley to the west and crosses Lake Valley Summit pass between the Fortification and Schell Creek ranges.

Fortification Range was named from a fancied resemblance to a fort.

References

External links
 Fortification Range Wilderness

Mountain ranges of Nevada
Mountain ranges of Lincoln County, Nevada